Mahmoud el-Meliguy (22 December 1910 – 6 June 1983) was an Egyptian screenwriter and an actor of film, theater, and television. He started his career playing minor roles, but achieved stardom in the late 1930s. A popular and award-winning actor, he has acted in hundreds of films and was famous for his evil, villain roles.

Career
El-Meliguy is the descendant of an Egyptian family that took its name from the Egyptian city of Melieg in Monufia Governorate. He breakthrough role came when Mohamed Abdel Wahab chose him to star in the film Lastu Mallak (I'm Not an Angel). He was paid 900 Egyptian pounds and quickly achieved stardom. People praised him for the villain role he played in that film, and film critics described him as “the wickedness of cinema”.

Personal life
Mahmoud el-Meliguy met the Egyptian actress Alwiya Gamil in 1938 and married her in 1939. He acted in several films with her. The couple had a happy and strong relationship. They did not have children together but raised two sons, Gamal El-Din and Morsi, and a daughter, Isis, from Alwiya's previous marriage. In 1963, after 24 years of his marriage to Alwiya Gamil, he married another woman, a young actress named Fawziyah al-Ansari, but their marriage lasted no longer than three days. Alwiya had allegedly compelled him to divorce her. His marriage with Alwiya Gamil ended in 1983, with his death.

Selected filmography
 1942: Ibn El-balad
 1947: Prisoner of Darkness
1949: The Flirtation of Girls
 1951: Son of the Nile
 1951: Your Day Will Come
1952: Ament Bellah
1953: A Million Pounds
1954: The Unjust Angel
1954: Delight of My Eyes
1957: The Tough
1958: Today’s Youth
 1958: Jamila, the Algerian
 1961: Oh Islam
 1962: The Cursed Palace
 1963: Saladin
 1968: The Splendor of Love
 1970: Sunset and Sunrise
 1970: The Land
1971: Confessions of A Woman
 1971: The Choice
 1972: Featureless Men
 1972: Those People of the Nile
 1972: A Call for Life
1972: The Sparrow
1974: Dunya
 1976: The Return of the Prodigal Son
 1978:  Roadless Traveller
 1981: Zeyara Serreya
 1982: An Egyptian Story

References

External links

Yalla Cinema
Yalla Cinema en

1910 births
1983 deaths
People from Monufia Governorate
Egyptian nationalists
Egyptian male film actors
Egyptian male stage actors
Egyptian male television actors
Egyptian screenwriters
Male actors from Cairo
20th-century Egyptian male actors
20th-century screenwriters